Mohsenabad (also Romanized as Moḩsenābād; also known as Gavdūshābād) is a village in Abarghan Rural District, in the Central District of Sarab County, East Azerbaijan Province, Iran. At the 2006 census, its population was 338, in 65 families.

References 

Populated places in Sarab County